"Turn to Stone" is a 1977 song by Electric Light Orchestra (ELO).

The song is the opening track to the double album Out of the Blue. It was the first song released as a single from the LP. The single reached No. 18 in the United Kingdom charts and spent twelve weeks on the chart. Out of four singles from the album, "Turn to Stone" was the only song not to reach the top ten in the United Kingdom singles charts. The song reached No. 13 in the United States and number nine in Canada in early 1978.

The song was composed in Switzerland during Jeff Lynne's two-week writing marathon for his double album. Lynne played the Moog bassline of the song.

On 4 November 2008, Lynne was awarded a BMI (Broadcast Music, Inc.) Million-Air certificate for "Turn to Stone" for having one million airplays.

Reviews
AllMusic reviewer Zachary Curd called the song "Essentially a love song, "Turn to Stone" is orchestrated, computerized, epic rock music courtesy of Jeff Lynne." The song was also reviewed by Donald A. Guarisco who stated "This dynamic opener from the Out of the Blue album is a good example of Electric Light Orchestra's skill for mixing string-laden pop hooks with driving rock and roll." He also stated "It also works in an array of swirling string lines that dart in and out of the mix and some dazzling falsetto harmonies that interact with Lynne's lead vocal in call and response style".

Billboard called "Turn to Stone" a "driving, high energy rocker" with a "demonic cello [setting] the pace." Record World said of it that "Echoes of a dozen pop hits resonate through [the song], yet the record clearly bears the Jeff Lynne stamp."

Ultimate Classic Rock critic Michael Gallucci rated it ELO's 5th best song, saying that it "comes with a Godzilla-size hook that stomps over everything in its way" and that the symphony of strings on the refrains is "awesome."

Charts

Weekly charts

Year-end charts

Certifications

Jeff Lynne version
Jeff Lynne re-recorded the song in his home studio. It was released in a compilation album with other re-recorded ELO songs, under the ELO name.

References

External links

1977 songs
1977 singles
1978 singles
Electric Light Orchestra songs
Jet Records singles
Song recordings produced by Jeff Lynne
Songs written by Jeff Lynne